Aurica may refer to:

Organizations 
Aurica Motors, a company

People 
Aurica Barascu, a female Olympic gold medal winner in rowing 
Aurica Buia, a retired female long-distance runner
Aurica Nestmile, a fictional character from Ar Tonelico: Melody of Elemia and Cross Edge
Aurica Valeria Motogna-Beșe, a Romanian handball player

Other 
Phalanta aurica, another name for the Phalanta alcippe butterfly
One of four proposed supercontinents predicted to form in around 200 million years